Asplenium antiquum is a fern of the group known as bird's-nest ferns. In Japanese it is known by ō-tani-watari  and tani-watari.

Description 
Asplenium antiquum is an evergreen fern, 2–3 ft. (60–90 cm). It has bright green, arching blades with a pointed end and a strong midrib. Asplenium antiquum can readily be distinguished from the closely related Asplenium nidus by its fronds of uniform width.

Chemical composition 
Mearnsetin 3,7-dirhamnoside, a glycoside of the flavonol mearnsetin, can be found in A. antiquum.

Taxonomy 
A global phylogeny of Asplenium published in 2020 divided the genus into eleven clades, which were given informal names pending further taxonomic study. A. antiquum belongs to the "Neottopteris clade", members of which generally have somewhat leathery leaf tissue. While the subclades of this group are poorly resolved, several of them share a characteristic "bird's-nest fern" morphology with entire leaves and fused veins near the margin. A. antiquum belongs to one of these subclades, together with A. antrophyoides, A. cymbifolium, A. humbertii, and A. phyllitidis. Other bird's-nest ferns, such as A. nidus sensu lato and A. australasicum, form a separate subclade which is not particularly closely related.

Distribution 
The fern is native to temperate East Asia, in China, Japan, Korea, and Taiwan on cliffs, dark forests, and tree trunks.  It is an IUCN endangered species in its native habitats.

Cultivation 
The fern is commonly available in the plant nursery trade as an ornamental plant in subtropical climates (USDA hardiness zones 9 and 10) and as a house plant in the United States and Europe in temperate climates. It requires high humidity and bright indirect light, so does best in a greenhouse or terrarium if grown indoors. It needs regular watering and can do with minimal soil (similar to an orchid).

References

External links

antiquum
Ferns of Asia
Flora of China
Flora of Japan
Flora of Korea
Flora of Taiwan
Endangered plants
Garden plants of Asia
House plants
Plants described in 1929